Mawuena Adzo Trebarh is a Ghanaian businesswoman who has worked in both the private and public sectors.

Trebarh was the first female CEO of the Ghana Investment Promotion Centre (GIPC) and the first female underground exploration geologist amidst a 10,000 strong male-workforce mine-site in the Ashanti Region.

She is also the first female Board Chair of Movenpick Ambassador Hotel Ghana.

Early life and education 
Mawuena was born in Ghana and went to University in Nigeria.

Mawuena's maternal grandfather, Philip Gbeho, was the composer of the National Anthem of Ghana and the music master of Achimota School. Her paternal grandfather, Michael Dumor, was a pioneer in the Catholic Education Project in the Volta Region beginning in the 1930s.

She is the eldest of three children, and her siblings are the late Komla Afeke Dumor of the BBC and Dr. Korshie Dumor, an internal medicine specialist based in the United States.

Mawuena is a graduate of the University of Jos in Plateau State, Nigeria, where she graduated with a Bachelor of Science degree in Geology and Mining in September 1996. She later studied for an MBA in Management and Strategic Planning at the McCallum Graduate School of Business, Bentley College in Waltham, Massachusetts in 2002.

Career

NDC Campaign 2020 
In 2020 she was named as the deputy spokesperson to the John Mahama and the National Democratic Congress (NDC) Election 2020 Campaign. She serves as the spokesperson and Head of communications for the office of the vice presidential candidate, Prof. Jane Naana Opoku-Agyemang.

Inspire Africa Consult 
As the Founding Director and Chief Business Strategist of Inspire Africa Consult, Mawuena leads the business strategy-consulting firm.

GIPC 

Mawuena Trebarh was the first female to be appointed substantive Chief Executive Officer of the Ghana Investment Promotion Centre (GIPC) from April 2013 to January 2017, where she was in charge of driving investment into the country. During her time as CEO foreign direct investment of US$1.12 billion was recorded in the first quarter of 2015, representing an increase of over 1000% over the same period in 2014. As CEO, Mawuena increased the Centre's income from GHS 7.9 million (approx. USD $700,000) to GHS 18.1 million (approx. USD $1.5 million) in 36 months representing an increase of almost 230%.

Scancom (MTN) 

From 2007 to 2011, Mawuena held the position of Corporate Services Executive at MTN Ghana, where she was responsible for overseeing corporate communications, government and regulatory relations, the MTN Ghana Foundation, legal matters, and company secretarial duties. In this role, she acted as the corporate spokesperson for the company and was involved in all aspects of reputation management.

Newmont 

Mawuena Trebarh was the Manager of Communications for Newmont Ghana Ltd between 2003 and 2007, where she developed and oversaw the execution of the world's largest gold producer's public relations and communications strategies in Ghana, the West African sub-region and the African continent in general.

She also promoted and maintained the company's image within Ghana through communications strategies including regular interaction with the news media, trade and interest groups, government officials and other stakeholders, as well as Newmont management within Ghana and at the corporate level.

Ashanti Goldfields 

Mawuena began her career at Ashanti Goldfields Company Ltd in 1996 where she was the first female underground exploration geologist.  During that period she planned and implemented exploration-drilling programs involving supervision of 15 to 20 men underground drilling teams with assignments at +5000 feet below surface.

She was then invited to the Resource Evaluation Department, where she assisted in the generation of three-dimensional computer models of gold deposits in Ghana, Guinea, Tanzania, Zimbabwe and Burkina Faso. In this role she conducted a complex quantitative analysis of exploratory drilling data resulting in declaration of 80.4 million ounces of gold reserves at spot price of $300/oz. over a two-year period and edited data reports for declared ounces quoted in all quarterly/ annual reports and corporate announcements.

She also worked as an investor Relations Officer at Ashanti Goldfields where she was responsible for retaining content expert status on strategic planning and new business development initiatives acting as primary interface between the company and international investment community, stock exchanges and senior analysts from Goldman Sachs, Merrill Lynch, CIBC etc. She was also responsible for tracking international reactions to corporate announcements, made recommendations regarding market sentiments, counseling management on responses.

Personal life 
Mawuena is married to a Flight Lieutenant of the Air force in the Ghana Armed Forces. She has called for changes to business practices in Ghana and increased female representation in work and media.

References

External links 

 Ghana Investment Promotion Center
 Movenpick Ambassador Hotel Ghana
 Inspire Africa Consult

Living people
Ghanaian Roman Catholics
University of Jos alumni
Geologists from Ghana
Ewe people
Gbeho family
Ghanaian women engineers
Year of birth missing (living people)